Wait EP is an EP release by The Polyphonic Spree. "Sonic Bloom" is a cover of a song by Tripping Daisy, the former band of three Polyphonic Spree members, Tim DeLaughter, Mark Pirro, and Bryan Wakeland. The EP also features covers of Nirvana's "Lithium" and The Psychedelic Furs' "Love My Way".

Track listing

References

2006 EPs
The Polyphonic Spree albums